Sant Esteve Sesrovires is a municipality in the northern part of the comarca of Baix Llobregat in Catalonia, Spain. It is situated on the left bank of the Anoia river, close to the A-2 highway, and is served by the FGC railway line R6 from Barcelona and Martorell to Igualada.

Demography 

Sant Esteve Sesrovires had a population of 7,771 in 2021, of which 3,910 were men and 3,861 women, according to data from the Statistical Institute of Catalonia (IDESCAT). 

 Population of Sant Esteve Sesrovires between 1717 and 2021

Economy 
The economy of Sant Esteve Sesrovires has historically benefited from its location close to the city of Barcelona. Manufacturing experienced a period of high growth in the town during the 20th century, going from a factory of wool scarves at the beginning of the century to more than 150 industries today, spread over various industrial estates. Among the companies present in Sant Esteve Sesrovires are the multinational confectionery maker Chupa Chups and the car manufacturer SEAT. The contribution of industry to the Gross Value Added produced in the municipality is therefore significant relative to the wider economy of both Catalonia and the rest of Spain. As a result, the proportion of workers employed in the industrial sector (c. 40%) is double the average in the comarca. 

The GDP per capita in 2019 was approximately €79,800, which was 144.9% higher than that of Catalonia, and 202% higher than that of Spain as a whole.

Notable people 
 Rosalía Vila, singer
 Enric Bernat, businessman and founder of Chupa Chups
 Pere Tarrés i Claret, medical doctor and Catholic priest

References

 Panareda Clopés, Josep Maria; Rios Calvet, Jaume; Rabella Vives, Josep Maria (1989). Guia de Catalunya, Barcelona: Caixa de Catalunya.  (Spanish).  (Catalan).

External links
 Government data pages 

Municipalities in Baix Llobregat